Stephen G. Burns is an American lawyer and former chairman of the Nuclear Regulatory Commission.

Education and career
Burns received a bachelor's degree in 1975 from Colgate University in Hamilton, New York. He received his J.D. degree with honors in 1978 from George Washington University in Washington, D.C., where he was an editor on the George Washington Law Review.

Burns joined the NRC as an attorney in 1978. He served as Deputy General Counsel starting in 1998 then served as General Counsel from May 2009 until April 2012. He left the NRC to serve as Head of Legal Affairs of the Nuclear Energy Agency (NEA) of the Organisation for Economic Co-operation and Development in Paris from April 2012, until he rejoined the NRC in November 2014 with a term which ended on April 30, 2019. He served as the 16th chairman of NRC from January 2014 to January 2017.

References

External links
 
NRC Profile Page

Living people
Nuclear Regulatory Commission officials
OECD officials
People associated with nuclear power
Colgate University alumni
George Washington University Law School alumni
Year of birth missing (living people)
Obama administration personnel
Trump administration personnel